(born 1957) is a Japanese actor.

Selected filmography

Films
Charisma (1999)
Cream Lemon (2004)
Persona (2008)
Climber's High (2008)
The Great Passage (2013)
The Vancouver Asahi (2014)
My Tomorrow, Your Yesterday (2016)
My Teacher (2017)
Outrage Coda (2017)
Narratage (2017)
Paradise Next (2019)
Shikake-nin Fujieda Baian (2023)

Television
Fūrin Kazan (2007), Takanashi Masayori
Segodon (2018), Yamauchi Yōdō
Hanzawa Naoki (2020), the prime minister Ichirō Matoba

References

External links
 Akira Otaka at Alpha Agency

1957 births
Living people
Japanese male actors
Place of birth missing (living people)